Joseph Hoare may refer to:
Joseph Hoare (Welsh academic) (1709–1802), Welsh clergyman and principal of Jesus College, Oxford
Joseph Hoare (bishop of Victoria) (1858–1906), Anglican bishop
Joseph Hoare (bishop of Ardagh and Clonmacnoise) (1842–1927), Roman Catholic bishop
Joseph Hoare (MP for Kingston upon Hull) (1814–1886), British politician and banker
Joe Hoare (1881–1947), English footballer
Sir Joseph Hoare, 1st Baronet (1707–1801) of the Hoare Baronets, MP for Askeaton
Sir Joseph Wallis Hoare, 3rd Baronet (1773–1852), of the Hoare baronets
Sir Joseph Wallis O'Bryen Hoare, 5th Baronet (1828–1904), of the Hoare baronets

See also
Hoare